Asbóth Oszkár, also rendered as Oskar Asboth, (31 March 1891 in Pankota – 27 February 1960 in Budapest) was a Hungarian aviation engineer often credited with the invention of the helicopter. His machine used stacked counterrotating propellers; Asbóth never solved the problem of in-flight stability, this was left to others.

He grew up in Arad, which is today part of Romania, and at a very young age began to explore the possibilities of human flight. Like most of the pioneers of aviation he was confronted with the challenge of stabilising the movement of the aeroplane, and to this end developed numerous devices. He sent one of his devices to the headquarters of the Air Force in Vienna.

As a result he made something of a name for himself while still very young. For his military service he was sent to the propeller development facility of Fischamend. During the First World War he was involved in the selection of propellers for the various types of aeroplane engine. He had a clear understanding of the principles involved in propeller development and production and was soon in a position to patent his own design for straight-edged, more efficient propellers, which could also be manufactured more simply.

Asbóth's design was successful and his propellers were used by several types of aeroplane in the First World War. From 1918, Asbóth's propellers were mass-produced in the First Propeller Works at Albertfalva, next to the Austro-Hungarian Monarchy's biggest aircraft-manufacturing plant, under Asbóth's supervision until the collapse of the monarchy. After the war a new propeller works, the "Express" Works, was built, which, until 1922 as a result of the aviation ban, produced mainly propellers for aircraft and boats. After the ban was lifted this company become the Oszkár Asbóth Aircraft Factory and began manufacturing in Budapest their patent light wooden car bodies, aeroplanes and propellers. The fuselages for Lajos Rotter's FEIRO-1 and for the Lampich L-1 flown by the amateur pilots of the technical university were built here.

In 1928, Asbóth followed up the earlier experimental work on vertical take-off aircraft, carried out during World War I by Petróczy, Kármán and Zurovec. The original prototypes carried a car for an observer and allowed rapid vertical flight using tethering cables to hold them in position and aid stability.

The aim of his experiments was to develop the device attached to a rope that was released into an aircraft that could fly freely through the air. Over the two years of experimentation the two large wooden propellers - positioned one above the other and rotating in opposite directions - managed to raise Asbóth's device into the air together with its pilot more than 250 times and for periods of almost one hour. But because of their rigid propellers Asbóth's "helicopters" became unstable when moving forward or when subjected to a strong side wind. Thanks to his ability with the pen and knowledge of foreign languages and guided by his business sense Asbóth ensured that news of his experiments travelled round the world and the great newspapers of the world described at length what were considered to be the first successful helicopter flights. Thanks to his shrewd business sense Asbóth was able to profit from his inventions.

He was director of Austria's Central Experimental Station.

In Hungary, Asbóth also experimented with automobiles powered by propellers. Due to a structural defect. this experiment resulted in a fatal accident, for which Asbóth was considered to be responsible and as a result he was condemned. Following this set-back, Asbóth took advantage of his outstanding international reputation and was able to continue his experimental work on helicopters, working for French, English and German companies.

He moved to the UK before the start of the Second World War. 

In 1941, he left Germany and returned to Hungary, where he experimented on boats powered by aircraft propellers and contributed to scientific journals. He continued this work after 1945 and worked as an expert for Innovations Implementation Company until his death. For his work on the development of aircraft propellers and his experimental work in general he received several Hungarian and international awards.
He died in Budapest at the age of 68.

Aircraft
 Asboth 1908 biplane
 Asboth AH-1
 Asboth AH-2
 Asboth AH-3
 Asboth AH-4

Noted Works
Asbóth, Oszkár

References

External links
the "Asboth Helicopter" Flight 21 March 1935

1891 births
1960 deaths
20th-century Hungarian engineers
20th-century Hungarian inventors